Mervana Jugić-Salkić (born 14 May 1980) is a retired Bosnian tennis player. She turned professional in 1999, and reached her highest singles ranking on 21 June 2004, when she was ranked world No. 99. On 10 July 2006, Jugić-Salkić reached world No. 59 in doubles, after winning the Auckland Open in 2004 with Jelena Kostanić, and Internazionali di Modena in 2005 with Yuliya Beygelzimer. She also won 15 singles and 43 doubles events on the ITF Circuit. In her career, she defeated players such as Yan Zi, Victoria Azarenka, Bethanie Mattek, Sania Mirza, Anabel Medina Garrigues, Nuria Llagostera Vives and Sybille Bammer.

Personal life
Jugić-Salkić was born to Hidajet and Hašiha Jugić. She began playing tennis rather late, aged 13, citing Gabriela Sabatini as her idol.

WTA career finals

Doubles: 4 (2 titles, 2 runner-ups)

ITF finals

Singles: 31 (15 titles, 16 runner-ups)

Doubles: 69 (43 titles, 26 runner-ups)

Grand Slam performance timelines

Singles

Doubles

References

External links
 
 
 

1980 births
Living people
Bosnia and Herzegovina female tennis players
Olympic tennis players of Bosnia and Herzegovina
Tennis players from Zagreb
Sportspeople from Zenica
Tennis players at the 2004 Summer Olympics 
Bosniaks of Croatia 
Bosniaks of Bosnia and Herzegovina